Coldwater Canyon Avenue (designated as Coldwater Canyon Drive south of Mulholland Drive) is a street, primarily within the City of Los Angeles, in Los Angeles County, California. It runs  from North Beverly Drive at Coldwater Canyon Park in Beverly Hills, north up Coldwater Canyon, including a short stretch shared with Mulholland Drive, ending at a crossroad intersection with Roscoe Boulevard in Sun Valley, where the Coldwater Canyon Avenue changes into Sheldon Street.

Route
Coldwater Canyon Avenue begins at a Y intersection with North Beverly Drive in Beverly Hills in the Westside region of Los Angeles. It then heads north within the canyon of the same name, running perpendicular to and then over the central Santa Monica Mountains, then descends into the eastern portion of the San Fernando Valley, continuing through that valley to Roscoe Boulevard. It parallels Laurel Canyon Boulevard for its entire length. Communities it passes through include Beverly Hills, Sherman Oaks, Valley Glen and Van Nuys. When passing through the Studio City community of Los Angeles, Coldwater Canyon Avenue crosses the main Los Angeles River, then runs along the west side of the north–south fork of Tujunga Wash, before crossing the wash to its east side, as the road continues north through the Valley Glen community. Coldwater Canyon Avenue continues north, parallel but at a steadily greater distance from Tujunga Wash. Coldwater Canyon Avenue moves closer to the east side of Tujunga Wash just before becoming the northeasterly Sheldon Street at a crossroad intersection with Roscoe Boulevard, in the western portion of the Sun Valley community of Los Angeles.

Coldwater Canyon Avenue is a busy thoroughfare, particularly as it winds through, and over, the Santa Monica Mountains between Beverly Hills and the San Fernando Valley. In this specific area, the neighborhoods are highly affluent.

Transportation

Metro Local line 167 services Coldwater Canyon Avenue between Roscoe and Ventura Boulevards.

Los Angeles Valley College and the adjacent Metro G Line station are located on Burbank Boulevard and Fulton Avenue, placed two long blocks west of Coldwater Canyon Avenue.

Features
 Franklin Canyon Park
 Harvard-Westlake School
 Los Angeles Valley College
 Wilacre Park

See also
 Coldwater Canyon

References

Streets in Los Angeles
Streets in Los Angeles County, California
Streets in the San Fernando Valley
Streets in Beverly Hills, California
Sherman Oaks, Los Angeles
Studio City, Los Angeles
Van Nuys, Los Angeles
Santa Monica Mountains